The 2020–21 season is Al Ain Football Club's 47th in existence and the club's 45th consecutive season in the top-level football league in the UAE.

Club

Technical staff
On 4 November 2020, Al Ain announced appointing David Platt as the Sports Director. On 13 December 2020, Goncalo Bexiga appointed as the Club’s Head of Scouting from Benfica in line with the improvement procedures adopted by the Al Ain Football Club Company to boost the key performance indicators at all levels, from First Team to Academy.
{| class="wikitable"
|-
! style="color:#FFFFFF; background: #7300E6; border:2px solid #AB9767;"|Position
! style="color:#FFFFFF; background: #7300E6; border:2px solid #AB9767;"|Name
|-
|Head coach
| Pedro Emanuel
|-
|Assistant coach
| Rui Gomes
|-
|Fitness coach
| André Galve
|-
|Goalkeeping coach
| Luis Miguel
|-
|First team technical analyst
| Virgilio Fernandes
|-
|Physiotherapist
| Fabio Santos
|-
|U-21 team head coach
| Ghazi Fahad
|-
|Team Manager
| Matar Obaid Al Sahbani
|-
|Team Supervisor
| Mohammed Obeid Hammad
|-
|Team Administrator
| Essam Abdulla
|-
|Director of football
| Sultan Rashed
|-
|Sports Director
| David Platt
|-
|Head Scout
| Goncalo Bexiga

Board of directors

Clean sheets
As of 11 May 2021

Goalscorers

Includes all competitive matches. The list is sorted alphabetically by surname when total goals are equal.

Disciplinary record

|-

Assists
As of 11 May 2021

Squad statistics

Notes

References

External links
 Al Ain FC official website 

2020–21
Emirati football clubs 2020–21 seasons